The National School of Film Arts ( or CUEC) is a public film school part of the National Autonomous University of Mexico in Mexico City. It was influenced by the Nouvelle Vague and by the First Contest of Experimental Film organized in Mexico that year.

In 42 years, CUEC has had as students several of the main Mexican filmmakers.

CUEC produces almost 100 short films a year, many showing at international festivals.

History 

The Escuela Nacional de Artes Cinematográficas was founded in 1963 as the official film school of the National Autonomous University of Mexico. In 1972, it became a member of the International Association of Film and Television Schools (CILECT). In 1986, it launched an annual cycle of film production. In 2015, the school launched a degree in Cinematography with nine specialty fields. In 2019, the school was supplemented by the National School of Cinematographic Arts, a new UNAM entity designed to give a national dimension to the film school.

Notable alumni
Alfonso Cuarón
Emmanuel Lubezki
Henner Hofmann
Alexis Zabé
Jaime Aparicio
Nicolas Echevarría
Fernando Eimbcke
Luis Estrada
Jorge Fons
Jaime Humberto Hermosillo
Julian Hernandez
Juan Mora
Carlos Marcovich
Maria Novaro
Raúl Kamffer (1st generation)

References

External links
ENAC official site

National Autonomous University of Mexico
Golden Ariel Award winners